HLA-DR5 (DR5) is a broad-antigen serotype that is further split into HLA-DR11 and HLA-DR12 antigen serotypes.

HLA-DR5 (Human Leukocyte Antigen DR5) is a protein that is encoded by a gene in the human leukocyte antigen (HLA) complex. The HLA complex is a group of genes located on chromosome 6 that plays a critical role in the immune system. HLA-DR5 is a type of HLA class II molecule that is expressed on the surface of immune cells called dendritic cells and monocytes.

HLA-DR5 is involved in the presentation of peptides, which are short chains of amino acids, to T cells, a type of immune cell that plays a key role in the immune response. When HLA-DR5 exposes a peptide to a T cell, it can activate the T cell and initiate an immunological response to the peptide.

HLA-DR5 has been the focus of research in the field of immunology due to its potential role in the development of autoimmune disorders, such as rheumatoid arthritis, and in the response to certain infections, such as HIV. In addition, HLA-DR5 has also been studied in the context of organ transplantation, as HLA matching is important in determining the success of a transplant.

Serology

Except for a few DRB1* alleles, the reactivity of DR5 is relatively poor.

Disease associations
DR5 is associated with persistent generalized lymphadenopathy and Kaposi's sarcoma in AIDS, juvenile rheumatoid arthritis, pernicious anemia, Hashimoto's thyroiditis, mycosis fungoides, polyglandular deficiency syndrome, systemic sclerosis, childhood epilepsy,  early-onset alopecia areata, short-ragweed Ra6 allergy, primary antiphospholipid syndrome, and increased longevity in the Dutch.

Genetic linkage
HLA-DR5 reactive gene products are linked to serology of HLA-DRB3 (HLA-DR52).

References

5